David Drake Limited was a major Australian shipbuilding company. It had facilities located at Bald Rock, Balmain, Johnson's Bay, Pyrmont and Drummoyne in New South Wales. David Drake began ship building in 1866, the ship building business was later incorporated. David died in 1922, and the shipbuilding business continued until 1934.

Ships
Annie D. (1866)
Evelyn (1867)
Albatross
Dunskey
Brooklyn S.
Bunya-Bunya
Waratah
SS Benelon
Gratitude
Terranora
Malekula
Mokau
Nugarea
Jubilee
Kamilaroi
Grazier
Lady Ferguson
SS Greycliffe (1910)
SS Kuramia (1913)
SS Cobaki (1918)
SS Narrabeen (1921)
Kai Kai
Killara
Kangaroo
Barangaroo
Bald Rock
Koree
Repton
Kosciusko
Kedumba
Wauchope
Lone Pine
Nanagai

Notes

Shipbuilding companies of Australia
Shipyards of New South Wales